Možjanca (in older sources also Možanca) is a small settlement in the Municipality of Preddvor in the Upper Carniola region of Slovenia.

Church

The local church is dedicated to Saint Nicholas. It was built in 1871 at the location of an earlier church.

References

External links
Možjanca at Geopedia.si

Populated places in the Municipality of Preddvor